Tate's Date is an album by saxophonist Buddy Tate which was recorded in 1959 and released on the Swingville label.

Track listing
 "Me 'n You" (Eli Robinson) – 7:15
 "Idling" (Sadik Hakim) – 4:37	
 "Blow Low" (Robinson) – 6:51	
 "Moon Dog" (Dicky Wells) – 4:55
 "No Kiddin'" (Wells) – 8:11
 "Miss Ruby Jones" (Robinson) – 6:10

Personnel
Buddy Tate – tenor saxophone
Pat Jenkins – trumpet
Eli Robinson – trombone
Ben Richardson – alto saxophone, baritone saxophone, clarinet
Sadik Hakim – piano
Wendell Marshall – bass
Osie Johnson – drums

References

Buddy Tate albums
1960 albums
Swingville Records albums
Albums recorded at Van Gelder Studio
Albums produced by Esmond Edwards